Maria Antonia Josepha Benedicta Rosalia Petronella of Austria (18 January 1669 – 24 December 1692) was an Electress of Bavaria as the wife of Maximilian II Emanuel, Elector of Bavaria. She was the eldest daughter and only surviving child of Holy Roman Emperor Leopold I and his first wife Margaret Theresa of Spain. She was the heir to the Spanish throne after her maternal uncle Charles II of Spain from 1673 until her death.

Life

Early life 
Archduchess Maria Antonia of Austria was born on 18 January 1669 in Vienna, Archduchy of Austria, Holy Roman Empire. She was the second child of Emperor Leopold I (1640–1705) and his wife Margaret Theresa of Spain (1651–1673). Her only older sibling had already died by the time she was born. She had 2 younger siblings, both of whom died in infancy, and twelve half-siblings, eight of whom lived into adulthood.

Maria Antonia had the highest coefficient of inbreeding in the House of Habsburg, 0.3053: her father was her mother's maternal uncle and paternal first cousin once removed, and her maternal grandparents were also uncle and niece. Her coefficient was higher than that of a child born to a parent and offspring, or brother and sister.

Since her childhood, Maria Antonia was an intelligent and cultivated girl, sharing her parents' passion for music.

The last Habsburg king of Spain, Charles II, never fathered any children, due to his severe deformities and illnesses. According to the laws of succession in Spain, Maria Antonia would have had the right to inherit the crown had she lived long enough, because she was the only surviving child of Empress Margaret Theresa, Charles II's sister. During her childhood, it was decided that she would marry her maternal uncle, Charles II, but this plan came to nothing due to political circumstances.

As an alternative, she became a candidate for marriage to Victor Amadeus II of Sardinia, the Duke of Savoy, but nothing came of these plans either.

Electress

Maria Antonia finally married Maximilian II, the Elector of Bavaria, on 15 July 1685 in Vienna. Maximilian married her in the hope of succeeding to the Spanish throne by her rights. Their marriage was very unhappy, as the extroverted Maximilian and the introverted and serious Maria Antonia had little in common. Maria Antonia was reportedly offended by Maximilian's constant infidelity, and when he was appointed governor of the Spanish Netherlands, and left for Brussels in the company of his mistress countess Canozza, Maria Antonia left for her father in Vienna to give birth, and it was widely assumed that she did not intend to return to Maximilian. She died of postpartum infections after childbirth.

As the niece of Charles II of Spain, Maria Antonia was of great relevance in connection with the succession to the Spanish throne, which was a major political issue in late 17th-century Europe.  One of her sons, Joseph Ferdinand, was of central importance to European politics at the end of the seventeenth century in spite of his youth, as a claimant to the throne of Spain in anticipation after his mother of the extinction of the House of Habsburg in that country.  Joseph Ferdinand's death before that of Charles II, the last Habsburg king of Spain, helped to trigger the War of the Spanish Succession.  If he had survived Charles, the European powers likely would have permitted him to accede to the throne of Spain.

Issue

Leopold Ferdinand of Bavaria (22 May 1689) died at birth.
Anton of Bavaria (19 November 1690) died at birth.
Joseph Ferdinand of Bavaria (28 October 1692 – 6 February 1699), died in childhood.

Ancestors

|-
|

|-
|style="text-align: left;"|Notes:

References

Bibliography
Friedrich Weissensteiner: Liebeshimmel und Ehehöllen - Heyne Taschenbuchverlag 1999 - 

1669 births
1692 deaths
17th-century House of Habsburg
Nobility from Vienna
House of Wittelsbach
Austrian princesses
Burials at the Imperial Crypt
Burials at St. Stephen's Cathedral, Vienna
17th-century Austrian people
17th-century Austrian women
Electresses of Bavaria
Deaths in childbirth
Daughters of emperors
Children of Leopold I, Holy Roman Emperor
Daughters of kings
Non-inheriting heirs presumptive